Kalmati or Qarmati, Qarmatian, Karmati, Kalmat is a Baloch clan settled in the Balochistan and Sindh provinces of Pakistan. They are part of the Hoth (Baloch Tribe) Hoth Tribe, claiming descent from King Hoth, a son of Jalal Khan. When the Hoths were ruling Kech Makran, a few members of the tribe settled in Kalmat, near the port of Pasni, in the coastal area of Balochistan. In the 12th century, the Kalmati had spread from Tehs Bandar in the western part of Balochistan to Shah Bandar in Sindh. Today, the Kalmati tribes live throughout the districts and towns of Balochistan and Sindh.

Kalmatis mostly work in cultivation and business. The famous graveyard called Chaukhandi tombs in Karachi, is associated with this tribe.

History 

The Soviet historic M. Pikulin in his book says: Kalmati (karmats) is a tribe of names in the oldest legends. The researchers note that this tribe is characterized by a large admixture of Indo-Iranian elements in all likelihood, the Baluchi-Qarmat is the descendants of the followers of the ancient religious and political sect of the early Middle Ages which in the 11th century portrayed its Qarmatian state in Multan and Northern India.

Baloch migration to Sindh and Punjab 
According to Dr. Akhtar Baloch, Professor at University of Karachi, the Balochs migrated from Balochistan during the Little Ice Age and settled in Sindh and Punjab. The Little Ice Age is conventionally defined as a period extending from the sixteenth to the nineteenth centuries, or alternatively, from about 1300 to about 1850. According to Professor Baloch, the climate of Balochistan was very cold during this epoch and the region was inhabitable during the winter so the Baloch people migrated in waves and settled in Sindh and Punjab.

The Portuguese 
In the 15th century, the Portuguese captured few ports of modern India and Oman, and planned to proceed with annexation of the coastal area of Makran. The Portuguese attacked Makran under the leadership of Vasco de Gama, but were repulsed by forces under the command of Mir Ismail. The Portuguese looted and set coastal villages on fire, but failed to capture the area of Makran. Cannons of the Portuguese army were found abandoned, lying near the central jail of Gwadar. Ismaheel's grave is situated near the Mountain of Batal Gwadar, constructed by Ismaheel during his life. He died in 1468.

After Ismail's regime, his nephew Hammal (kalmati Hooth), son of Jihand Khan (Hooth), became the ruler of Makran. During his rule, the Portuguese initiated several attacks under the command of Lowess Dee Almia, but they were repelled each time, eventually agreeing to a truce wherein the Portuguese agreed not to attack the Makran coastal area. However, when Hammal was at sea with some companions, the Portuguese attacked his ship and too Hammal captive. A statue Hammal resides in a museum on the island of Goha in India, constructed by the Portuguese.

During this time, the Portuguese also attacked Tehs Bandar, which was under the command of Kareem Dad, who died in the attack along with 44 of his soldiers.

Resistance in Sindh 
In the Mughal Empire, the Kalmati tribe had a broad power base Hub to Keti Bandar in the Sindh province. After the Mughal defeat of the Portuguese from Ran Kach, the Mughals decided that the Kalmati had become a threat to their empire. Mughal emperor, Akbar, plotted with local Sardars (Chiefs) to overthrow the local Kalmati chiefs. However, both being Baloch peoples, as well as a Kalmati force consisting of approximately 20,000 troops, foiled Akbar's plan. His defeat led him to cede a large tract of agricultural land in Chachkan in Sindh province to the Kalmati, in 1654. When his successor, Mughal Emperor Aurangzeb also failed in his attempt to break the power of the Kalmati, he ceded even more land to the Kalmati (this time in Sakro), in exchange for them not becoming rebels against the empire. During this period the Kalmati made alliances with other Baloch tribes, creating a Baloch confederacy. Mughal traders used the roads and sea routes in Sindh and Balochistan, and the Kalmati Sardar charged Rs. 9,600 per year as taxes from the Mughals.

Attacks of Arghoons 
When Saleh Baig became Mirza, he began a policy of persecution towards the Kalmati. As part of that persecution, Baig had the family of a person named Mureed executed. Mureed vowed to not wear the traditional turban (Pagri) until he had avenged them by killing Baig. One day in Thatta, Mureed saw Baig patrolling in the city with his protocol staff. Mureed assassinated Baig, and was in turn killed by Baig's protocol staff. This was a difficult period for all the Baloch tribes.

War with Kalhoros 
In the regime of Mia Yar, the Kalmati were the only tribe to refuse to pay taxes to the government of Kalhora. The tax consisted of 50 camels or their equivalent value. In response, Muhammad Kalhoro attacked Malir, in modern Karachi, with 18,000 troops. The Kalmati became aware of the impending attack, and they relocated their cattle, women and children to a place called Lat Koh (Lat Mountain), situated between Gadap and Kon Kor. In the ensuing battle, the government troops defeated the Kalmati tribe, with the remnants fleeing to Lat Koh. These Kalmati were called the Lati or Lateeg.

Kalmati lose Karachi to the British 
On 2 February 1839, two British naval ships, the H.M.S. Hina and Wales, arrived at Manora island of Karachi. They called on the Kalmatis to evacuate the port and surrender their arms. The tribe's commander refused to surrender, and replied, according to legend, "I am a Baloch and would prefer to be a martyr than to surrender."

Due to the power of the British forces, the Baloch began a guerilla war. After capturing Karachi, the British had built a military strongholds in Manora and Aram Bagh areas of Karachi.

References

Social groups of Pakistan
Baloch tribes
Sindhi tribes